Lapwai is a city in the northwest United States, in Nez Perce County, Idaho. Its population was 1,137 at the 2010 census, and it is the seat of government of the Nez Perce Indian Reservation.
Lapwai actually means "The land of the butterflies"

History

The area that is today Lapwai was the home of Hin-ma-tute-ke-kaikt, also known as Big Thunder and later as James.  It was here that Henry Spalding established a Protestant mission among the Nez Perce in 1836.  This was also the general region that Bill Craig settled, since his wife was James' daughter.

The city's predecessor, Fort Lapwai, operated on the site from 1863 to 1884. The village of Lapwai was incorporated in 1911, with a model rural school.

The word "Lapwai" means place of the butterflies, as the area had thousands in early summer in earlier years.

Lapwai is part of the Lewiston, ID-WA Metropolitan Statistical Area.

Geography

Lapwai is located on the floor of a valley carved by Lapwai Creek, roughly 3 miles south of its confluence with the Clearwater River. The hills to the east and west of the city rise dramatically more than 600 feet in less than a mile from the city. U.S. Route 95 passes through Lapwai.

Transportation

Highway
  - US 95 - to  Lewiston (north & west) and Grangeville (southeast)

Railroad
The city is served by the BG&CM Railroad, a freight carrier which operates on the former Second Subdivision line of the Camas Prairie Railroad.

Education
The public schools in Lapwai are operated by Lapwai School District #341, led by Lapwai High School.

Demographics

2010 census
As of the census of 2010, there were 1,137 people, 369 households, and 272 families living in the city. The racial makeup of the city was 16.6% White, 0.4% African American, 78.1% Native American, 0.1% Asian, 0.7% from other races, and 4.1% from two or more races. Hispanic or Latino of any race were 4.0% of the population.

There were 369 households, of which 46.9% had children under the age of 18 living with them, 35.2% were married couples living together, 26.8% had a female householder with no husband present, 11.7% had a male householder with no wife present, and 26.3% were non-families. 22.8% of all households were made up of individuals, and 8.7% had someone living alone who was 65 years of age or older. The average household size was 3.08 and the average family size was 3.58.

The median age in the city was 30.8 years. 31.4% of residents were under the age of 18; 10.9% were between the ages of 18 and 24; 23.9% were from 25 to 44; 24.6% were from 45 to 64; and 9.3% were 65 years of age or older. The gender makeup of the city was 48.7% male and 51.3% female.

2000 census
At the 2000 census, there were 1,134 people, 339 households, and 270 families living in the city. The racial makeup of the city was 16.14% White, 0.53% African American, 81.39% Native American, 0.62% from other races, and 1.32% from two or more races. Hispanic or Latino of any race were 4.32% of the population.

There were 339 households, out of which 48.1% had children under the age of 18 living with them, 40.1% were married couples living together, 27.1% had a female householder with no husband present, and 20.1% were non-families. 17.1% of all households were made up of individuals, and 6.8% had someone living alone who was 65 years of age or older.  The average household size was 3.35 and the average family size was 3.68.

In the city, the population was spread out, with 39.8% under the age of 18, 9.3% from 18 to 24, 26.6% from 25 to 44, 17.7% from 45 to 64, and 6.5% who were 65 years of age or older.  The median age was 26 years. For every 100 females, there were 92.2 males.  For every 100 females age 18 and over, there were 90.8 males.

The median income for a household in the city was $26,800, and the median income for a family was $30,417. Males had a median income of $31,382 versus $22,109 for females. The per capita income for the city was $10,159.  About 20.5% of families and 23.7% of the population were below the poverty line, including 30.5% of those under age 18 and 10.2% of those age 65 or over.

Notable residents
 Lillian Disney, wife of Walt Disney
 Chaske Spencer, played Sam Uley in the Twilight series

See also
 List of cities in Idaho
 Fort Lapwai
 Nez Perce Horse
 Nez Perce people
 Nez Perce War

References

External links

 
 Lapwai School District #341
 University of Idaho Library - digital archives - Lapwai
 University of Washington Libraries - digital archives - Lapwai

Seats of government of American Indian reservations
Cities in Idaho
Cities in Nez Perce County, Idaho
Lewiston–Clarkston metropolitan area
1911 establishments in Idaho